The 39 Steps is an upcoming Netflix original limited series directed by Edward Berger and based on the 1915 novel of the same name by John Buchan. Its story follows an average man who becomes a key piece in a worldwide conspiracy to reset the world order.

Cast and characters 
 Benedict Cumberbatch as Richard Hannay

References

External links 
 

Upcoming Netflix original programming
2023 British television series debuts
2020s British drama television series
2020s British television miniseries
British thriller television series
English-language Netflix original programming
Television shows based on British novels
Television series by Anonymous Content
John Buchan